Sphodromantis aethiopica, common name Ethiopian mantis, is a species of praying mantis found in Ethiopia.

See also
African mantis
List of mantis genera and species

References

Aethiopica
Mantodea of Africa
Insects of Ethiopia
Insects described in 1987